Judith Benhamou-Huet is a French journalist, independent curator and author specialized in art and the art market. She is a weekly columnist for the French newspaper Les Echos and regularly publishes articles related to art and the art market on her own blog Judith Benhamou-Huet Reports. Benhamou-Huet is also the author of a number of books as well as an independent curator.

Career

Writing
In the early 1990s, Benhamou-Huet began her career as a weekly columnist for the French daily Les Échos Benhamou-Huet collaborated with Interview Magazine, Vogue Paris, Neue Zürcher Zeitung, Art & Auction, Artinfo, ArtPress, Beaux-Arts and Connaissance des Arts. In the early 2000s she began her weekly column for the French Magazine Le Point. She is now also involved in Les Echos TV and BFM TV where she presents, on a weekly basis, her views on current art exhibitions of the French and international art scene.

Alongside to her journalistic achievements, Benhamou-Huet wrote several books. Among them are Art Business (2001) and Art Business (2) (2007), published in English with the title The Worth of Art and The Worth of Art (2). In these publications, Benhamou-Huet analyzes the principles of valuation in the contemporary art market. Thus far, the two volumes have been translated from French to English, Mandarin Chinese and Russian.

In 2008, Benhamou-Huet authored Global Collectors, written in both French and English and published by Phébus in which she profiled 120 international art collectors.

In 2012, Benhamou-Huet wrote Les Artistes ont Toujours Aimé L'Argent. D'Albrecht Durer à Damien Hirst, a study of notable artists throughout history and their – sometimes unexpected - relationship to money. The book was published by Grasset in France and by World Publishing Beijing in China.

In 2014, Benhamou-Huet authored a biographical account of the life of the artist, Robert Mapplethorpe, published in France by Grasset.  Titled Dans la vie noire et blanche de Robert Mapplethorpe, the book was followed closely by Mapplethorpe, Vivant – Réponse à des Questions in which Benhamou-Huet presented a series of exclusive interviews of relatives, friends, curators and former boyfriends of Mapplethorpe, each relating singular details of the artist’s life and art. The book was published by Presses du Réel. Both works emanate from researches Benhamou-Huet did on the occasion of her curating and co-curating two shows on Mapplethorpe at the Musée Rodin and at the Grand Palais in Paris.

Curatorial Practice
As an independent curator, Benhamou-Huet curated an exhibition titled Warhol TV (2009) in which she explored Andy Warhol's connection to television and for which she also wrote the exhibition catalogue. Warhol TV toured in Paris at La Maison Rouge, the Berardo Museum in Lisbon, and in several other institutions in Brazil including Oi Futuro Flamengo in Rio de Janeiro, Oi Futoro in Belo Horizonte and Sesc Pinheiros in São Paulo.

In 2014, Benhamou-Huet co-curated the exhibition "Mapplethorpe-Rodin" at the Musée Rodin in Paris and was an associate-curator of the Robert Mapplethorpe retrospective at the Grand Palais.

Judith has curated an exhibition of the Chinese artist Ai Weiwei at the Mucem in Marseille. The exhibition Ai Weiwei Fan-Tan has opened in June 2018 and featured works by Ai Weiwei in dialogue with the museum's collection.

In 2022, Judith has co-curated the exhibition Serra/Seurat. Drawings at the Guggenheim Museum Bilbao. The exhibition brings together a selection of 22 drawings by the late 19th-century master Georges Seurat, which in turn engage in dialogue with the drawings of Richard Serra, a great admirer of Seurat’s.

Publishing history

References

External links
Articles by Judith Benhamou-Huet at Les Échos
Articles by Judith Benhamou-Huet at Le Point
Judith Benhamou-Huet's website

Living people
French art curators
French art historians
Cultural historians
Women art historians
Year of birth missing (living people)
Place of birth missing (living people)
French women historians
French women curators